The 2022 Dwars door Vlaanderen was a road cycling one-day race that took place on 30 March 2022 in Belgium. It was the 76th edition of Dwars door Vlaanderen and the 11th event of the 2022 UCI World Tour. It was won by Mathieu van der Poel.



Teams
All eighteen UCI WorldTeams and six UCI ProTeams participated in the race.

UCI WorldTeams

 
 
 
 
 
 
 
 
 
 
 
 
 
 
 
 
 
 

UCI ProTeams

Results

References

Dwars door Vlaanderen
Dwars door Vlaanderen
Dwars door Vlaanderen
Dwars door Vlaanderen